Daniel Tay (born December 17, 1991) is an American former actor. He is best known for his role as Michael Hobbs in Elf.

Early life
Tay was born in New York City, New York on December 17, 1991. He is Jewish.

Career
Tay's acting debut was at the age of 11 in Elf as Michael Hobbs. The same year, he appeared in American Splendor as Young Harvey Pekar. His other acting roles include Artie Lange's Beer League as Max and Brooklyn Rules as Young Bobby.

Tay was the voice of the titular character Doogal in Doogal. He has also done voice work for video games by Rockstar Games, voicing Pedro De La Hoya in Bully and Bill Blue in Grand Theft Auto: The Ballad of Gay Tony.

References

External links
 

1991 births
Living people
American male voice actors
American male child actors
American male film actors
American male video game actors
Male actors from New York City
21st-century American male actors